Stefan Metz (born 15 October 1951 in Kaufbeuren) is an ice hockey player who played for the West German national team. He won a bronze medal at the 1976 Winter Olympics.

References

External links
 
 
 
 

1951 births
Living people
Ice hockey players at the 1976 Winter Olympics
Olympic ice hockey players of West Germany
West German ice hockey forwards
Olympic medalists in ice hockey
Olympic bronze medalists for West Germany
Medalists at the 1976 Winter Olympics
People from Kaufbeuren
Sportspeople from Swabia (Bavaria)
German ice hockey forwards